Vladimir Skomarovsky (born 1932) is a Soviet former swimmer. He competed in the men's 100 metre freestyle at the 1952 Summer Olympics.

References

1932 births
Living people
Soviet male freestyle swimmers
Olympic swimmers of the Soviet Union
Swimmers at the 1952 Summer Olympics
Place of birth missing (living people)